Paul Andrew Joncich (born October 14, 1961) is an Emmy Award winning American journalist from Tucson, Arizona.

References

External links
  (Alternate)

1961 births
Living people
American male journalists
American television reporters and correspondents
Journalists from Arizona
Journalists from California
Journalists from Colorado
Journalists from Las Vegas
Journalists from Ohio
Loyola Marymount University alumni
Television anchors from Cleveland
Television anchors from Las Vegas
Television anchors from Sacramento, California